Parachute is the first album by the band Guster, released in 1994. Four thousand copies were released under the band name Gus (the band had to change its name shortly afterward when another artist signed a record contract under that name). Those copies are considered very rare by Guster fans.

The stuffed animal on the cover of the album is a childhood toy of the percussionist Brian Rosenworcel and is lovingly referred to as "The Big Friend." It has become a mascot of sorts for the band.

Critical reception
The Boston Globe named the album the best local debut of 1994.

Track listing
"Fall in Two"
"Mona Lisa"
"Love for Me"
"Window"
"Eden"
"Scars & Stitches"
"The Prize"
"Dissolve"
"Cocoon"
"Happy Frappy"
"Parachute"

Personnel
 Jay Bellerose - drums
 Mike Denneen - chamberlin
 Scott Davis
 Clayton Scoble - electric guitar, 12-string guitar
 Michael Rivard - upright bass
 Adam Gardner - vocals, guitar
 Brian Rosenworcel - bongos, percussion
 Ryan Miller - vocals, guitar
 Andy Custer - electric bass
 Dejan Kralj - guitar
 Goran Kralj - vocals, guitar, piano
 Jeff Murphy
 Milt Sutton
 Morgan Dawley
 Scott Schwebel - drums, percussion
 Steve Garrett - cello
 Tom Swafford - violin
 Wes Yoakam - vocals, guitar, keyboards

Miscellaneous
In the early years of music file sharing, a form of bait and switch involving Parachute occurred.
In the comments of the song Guster - Parachute [Best Quality] on YouTube, many people report of having downloaded Coldplay's – Parachutes album via online music sharing platforms. In lieu of the real Track 7 – Parachutes, Guster's Track 11 – Parachute from their Parachute album had been inserted instead.

By searching for the lyrics of the misplaced song, some fans eventually uncovered that it was actually Parachute from Guster and unrelated to the Parachutes song from Coldplay.
People discovering the true artist after years of confusion seemed pleased to find out the origin of the song. This is supported by select quotes from users on YouTube:

It is unclear if this was an intentional replacement—for either marketing or trolling purposes—or an accident.

References

Guster albums
1995 debut albums